The Second Game (Romanian: Al doilea joc) is a 2014 Romanian documentary film directed by Corneliu Porumboiu. The film integrally depicts the Dinamo — Steaua football derby played on 3 December 1988; the game is commented on by Porumboiu and his father, Adrian, the referee of that match.

It was selected for the Forum section at the 64th Berlin International Film Festival.

References 

2014 films
Films directed by Corneliu Porumboiu
2010s Romanian-language films
2014 documentary films
Romanian documentary films
Documentary films about association football
Second